February 14 - Eastern Orthodox liturgical calendar - February 16

All fixed commemorations below are observed on February 28 by Eastern Orthodox Churches on the Old Calendar.

For February 15th, Orthodox Churches on the Old Calendar commemorate the Saints listed on February 2.

Saints

 Apostle Onesimus of the Seventy (c. 109)
 Martyr Major of Gaza (302)
 Venerable Paphnutius, monk, and his daughter St. Euphrosyne, nun, of Alexandria (5th century)  (see also: September 25)
 Venerable Eusebius, hermit, of Asikha in Syria (5th century)
 Saint Theognius, Bishop of Bethelia near Gaza (523)

Pre-Schism Western saints

 Saints Faustinus and Jovita, two brothers, belonging to the nobility of Brescia in Italy, zealous preachers of Orthodoxy, beheaded in their native city under Hadrian (2nd century)
 Virgin-martyr Agape, in Terni (Teramo) in Italy (c. 273) 
 Martyr Craton and Companions, converted to Christ by St Valentine, Bishop of Terni, martyred in Rome together with his wife and family (c. 273)
 Martyrs Saturninus, Castulus, Magnus and Lucius, who belonged to the flock of St Valentine, Bishop of Terni in Italy (273)
 Saint Dochow (Dochau, Dogwyn), founder of a monastery in Cornwall (c. 473)
 Saint Georgia, a holy virgin and later anchoress near Clermont in Auvergne in France  (c. 500)
 Saint Severus, a priest from the Abruzzi in Italy (c. 530)
 Saint Quinidius, after living as a hermit in Aix in Provence, he became Bishop of Vaison in France (c. 579)
 Saint Farannan, Confessor, a disciple of St Columba at Iona in Scotland (c. 590)
 Saint Berach (Barachias, Berachius), disciple of St Kevin and founder of a monastery at Clusin-Coirpte in Connaught (6th century)
 Saint Faustus, a disciple of St Benedict at Montecassino in Italy (6th century)
 Saint Oswy, King of Northumbria (670)
 Saint Decorosus, for thirty years Bishop of Capua in Italy, Confessor (695)
 Saint Walfrid (Gualfredo) della Gherardesca (765)
 Saints Winaman, Unaman and Sunaman, monks and nephews of St Sigfrid whom they followed to Sweden, martyred by pagans (c. 1040)
 Saint Sigfrid of Sweden, a priest and monk, probably at Glastonbury in England, who went to enlighten Sweden, based in Växjö, and converted King Olaf of Sweden (1045)
 Saint Druthmar, a monk at Lorsch Abbey, in 1014 he became Abbot of Corvey in Saxony in Germany (1046)

Post-Schism Orthodox saints

 Venerable Paphnutius, recluse of the Kiev Caves Monastery (13th century)
 Venerable Dalmatius of Siberia, Abbot and founder of the Dormition Monastery (1697)  (see also: June 10 - Synaxis of All Saints of Siberia)
 New martyr John of Thessaloniki (1776)
 Venerable Anthimos (Vagianos) of Chios (1960)  (see also: February 2)

New martyrs and confessors

 New Hieromartyrs Michael Pyatayev and John Kuminov, Priests of Omsk (1930)
 New Hieromartyr Paul (Kozlov), Hieromonk of St. Nilus Hermitage, Tver (1938)
 New Hieromartyrs Nicholas Morkovin, Alexis, and Alexis, Priests; and Simeon, Deacon (1938)
 Virgin-martyr Sophia (1938)

Other commemorations

 Synaxis of the Church of St. John the Theologian at Diaconissa. 
 Synaxis of the Icon of the Mother of God of Vilnius.
 Synaxis of Icon of the Mother of God of Dalmatia. 
 Repose of Blessed Stoina (Euphemia) of Devic Monastery, Serbia (1895)
 Repose of Schema-monk Nikodim of Karoulia (1984)
 Repose of Monk Marcu (Dumitrescu) of Sihastria (ro), Romania (1999)

Icon gallery

Notes

References

Sources
 February 15 / 28. Orthodox Calendar (Pravoslavie.ru).
 February 28 / 15. Holy Trinity Russian Orthodox Church (A parish of the Patriarchate of Moscow).
 February 15. OCA - The Lives of the Saints.
 The Autonomous Orthodox Metropolia of Western Europe and the Americas. St. Hilarion Calendar of Saints for the year of our Lord 2004. St. Hilarion Press (Austin, TX). p. 15.
 The Fifteenth Day of the Month of February. Orthodoxy in China.
 February 15. Latin Saints of the Orthodox Patriarchate of Rome.
 The Roman Martyrology. Transl. by the Archbishop of Baltimore. Last Edition, According to the Copy Printed at Rome in 1914. Revised Edition, with the Imprimatur of His Eminence Cardinal Gibbons. Baltimore: John Murphy Company, 1916. pp. 48-49.
 Rev. Richard Stanton. A Menology of England and Wales, or, Brief Memorials of the Ancient British and English Saints Arranged According to the Calendar, Together with the Martyrs of the 16th and 17th Centuries. London: Burns & Oates, 1892. pp. 69-72.
Greek Sources
 Great Synaxaristes:  15 Φεβρουαρίου. Μεγασ Συναξαριστησ.
  Συναξαριστής. 15 Φεβρουαρίου. Ecclesia.gr. (H Εκκλησια Τησ Ελλαδοσ). 
Russian Sources
  28 февраля (15 февраля). Православная Энциклопедия под редакцией Патриарха Московского и всея Руси Кирилла (электронная версия). (Orthodox Encyclopedia - Pravenc.ru).

February in the Eastern Orthodox calendar